70,000 Witnesses is a 1932 American pre-Code mystery film directed by Ralph Murphy, written by Garrett Fort, Robert N. Lee, Allen Rivkin and P.J. Wolfson, and starring Phillips Holmes, Dorothy Jordan, Charlie Ruggles, Johnny Mack Brown, J. Farrell MacDonald, Lew Cody and David Landau. It was released on September 9, 1932, by Paramount Pictures. The film's sets were designed by the art director David S. Garber.

In the film, a star player of college football collapses during a game. He dies shortly after, and his death is initially ruled accidental. But a police detective wants to re-enact the football game, in an attempt to find who killed the player.

Plot

Buck Buchanan plays football for State, but his criminal brother Slip Buchanan has placed a whopping $350,000 wager on University defeating State in the upcoming big game.

Slip attempts to coerce his brother into drugging a star teammate, Wally Clark, so he is unable to play. Buck refuses to do so, but is distracted on the field of play by his suspicions that Slip will find another way to do Wally harm.

Sure enough, just as Wally is about to score a State touchdown, he collapses at the 5 yard line. As 70,000 spectators look on, Wally is carried from the field and expires. A doctor rules the death accidental, but a police detective, Dan McKenna, is so convinced of foul play, he has the players reassembled and the entire football play re-enacted, solving the case.

Cast 
Phillips Holmes as Buck Buchanan
Dorothy Jordan as Dorothy Clark
Charlie Ruggles as Johnny Moran
Johnny Mack Brown as Wally Clark
J. Farrell MacDonald as State Coach
Lew Cody as Slip Buchanan
David Landau as Dan McKenna
Kenneth Thomson as Dr. Collins
Guinn "Big Boy" Williams as Connors

References

External links 
 

1932 films
1932 mystery films
1930s sports films
American sports films
American black-and-white films
American football films
American mystery films
Films directed by Ralph Murphy
Paramount Pictures films
1930s English-language films
Films with screenplays by Garrett Fort
1930s American films
English-language sports films